Potassium hexanitritocobaltate(III) is a salt with the formula K3[Co(NO2)6].  It is a yellow solid that is poorly soluble in water. The compound finds some use as a yellow pigment under the name Indian Yellow.

The salt features potassium cations and an trianionic coordination complex.  In the anion, cobalt is bound by six nitrito ligands, the overall complex having octahedral molecular geometry.  The oxidation state of cobalt is 3+.  Its low-spin d6 configuration confers kinetic stability and diamagnetism.  The compound is prepared by combining cobalt(II) and nitrite salts in the presence of oxygen.  The corresponding sodium cobaltinitrite is significantly more soluble in water.

The compound was first described in 1848 by Nikolaus Wolfgang Fischer in Breslau, and it is used as a yellow pigment called Aureolin.

See also
Sodium hexanitritocobaltate(III)

References

Potassium compounds
Cobalt compounds
Nitrites
Coordination complexes